Marika is a feminine given name of Polish, Greek, and Japanese origin. It has its origin in the Hungarian and Greek nickname for Maria, or its Silesian diminutive "Maryjka". Marieke is the Dutch and Flemish equivalent. Marika is also a Fijian given name.

Marika is also a surname of the Aboriginal Australian people of Arnhem Land known as the Yolngu.


People with the given name
Marika Eensalu (born 1947), Estonian opera singer and music pedagogue
Marika Gombitová (born 1956), Slovak pop singer
Marika Green (born 1943), Swedish/French actress
Marika Hackman (born 1992), English nu-folk singer/songwriter
, Japanese actress and voice actress
Marta "Marika" Kosakowska (born 1980), Polish singer
Marika Kōno (born 1994), Japanese voice actress and singer
Marika Kotopouli (1887-1954), Greek actress
Marika Krevata (1910-1994), Greek actress
Marika Krook (born 1972), Finnish singer and actress
Marika Matsumoto (born 1984), Japanese actress
Marika Mitsotakis (1930–2012), Greek cookbook writer
Marika Nezer (1906-1989), Greek actress
Marika Ninou (1918-1957), Greek rembetiko singer
Marika Papagika (1890-1943), Greek singer
Marika Rökk (1913–2004), German actress and singer
Marika Shaw, Canadian violist/violinist
Marika Siewert, Canadian singer/songwriter 
Marika Takeuchi (born 1987), Japanese composer and pianist
Marika Tuus-Laul (born 1951), Estonian politician
Marika Vunibaka (born 1974), Fijian rugby union player

People with the surname
The surname Marika is a surname of a clan of an Aboriginal Australian, the Yolngu of Arnhem Land in the Northern Territory, and has close links with the Yunupingu and Gurruwiwi families. Some notable people bearing the name include:
 Banula Marika, aka David, dancer with Bangarra Dance Theatre, Yothu Yindi member (from 1993) (son of Roy, brother of Raymattja)
 Banduk Marika (1954–2021), artist and activist (daughter of Mawalan 1)
  Bayulma Marika, child actor in the film Banduk (1985)
  Bunimburr Marika, didgeridoo player and member of Yothu Yindi (from 1993)
 Dhuwarrwarr Marika (born 1946), artist (daughter of Mawalan 1)
 Kathy Balngayngu Marika (1957-), dancer 
 Mathaman Marika (c. 1920–1970), artist (brother of Mawalan 1, Roy and Milirrpum)
 Mawalan Marika (1908-1967), aka Mawalan 1 Marika, artist (father of Banduk, Dhuwarrwarr and Wandjuk)
 Mawalan Marika (born 1957), aka Mawalan 2 Marika (son of Wandjuk)
 Milirrpum Marika (c. 1923–1983), artist, known for the Gove land rights case in 1971 (brother of Mawalan 1, Mathaman and Roy)
 Raymattja Marika (1959–2008), educator, linguist and activist (daughter of Roy, sister of Banula)
 Roy Dadaynga Marika (1925–1993), artist and Indigenous rights activist (brother of Mawalan 1, Mathaman and Milirrpum)
 Wandjuk Marika (1927–1987), artist, actor and activist (son of Mawalan 1)
 Witiyana Marika, musician and elder, founding member of Yothu Yindi (father of Yirrmal)
 Yalmay Marika Yunupingu (born 1956), artist and teacher-linguist at Yirrkala Community Education Centre (daughter of Mathaman)
 Yirrmal Marika (born 1993), singer and songwriter, known professionally as Yirrmal (son of Witiyana)

Czech feminine given names
Hungarian feminine given names
Japanese feminine given names
Latvian feminine given names
Slovak feminine given names
Surnames

pl:Marika